Abdaal Bela (born 14 December 1956) is an Urdu-language fiction writer from Pakistan.

Early life 

Abdaal Bela was born in Sialkot, Punjab, Pakistan. He is a son of Ch. Fazal Din. His parents migrated from Ludhiana, British India, and settled in Lahore. Bela's schooling and college life took place in Lahore. He studied at the Government College Lahore and the Punjab Medical College in Faisalabad.  As an MBBS doctor he started his career as a Captain in the Pakistan Army. He also served in the Saudi Army and in the Pakistan Navy. He gained a MSc in Hospital Administration from Quaid-e-Azam University, Islamabad, in 1997. He retired from the Pakistan Army as a colonel in 2007 while serving as Deputy Director ISPR.

References

External links
 WorldCat list of Abdal Bela works

Pakistani writers
Urdu-language fiction
1956 births
Living people